Oxalate oxidoreductases (OOR) are a relatively recently discovered group of enzymes that break down oxalate, a problematic molecule nutritionally.  The first one to have been characterized has the systematic name oxalate:ferredoxin oxidoreductase.  This enzyme catalyses the following chemical reaction:

 oxalate + oxidized ferredoxin  2 CO2 + reduced ferredoxin

This enzyme contains thiamine diphosphate and [4Fe-4S] clusters.

Another OOR from acetogenic bacteria, a thiamine pyrophosphate (TPP)-dependent OOR, had its mechanism of action decoded step by step under X-ray crystallography to rather simplistically (one-carbon) split oxalate, producing low-potential electrons and CO2.

References

External links 
 

EC 1.2.7